Direct elections in the Democratic Republic of the Congo occur for the Presidency, National Assembly (lower house of the legislature), and provincial assemblies. The Senate, the upper house of the legislature, is elected indirectly by members of the provincial assemblies.

The 1960 elections, held just before independence, saw Patrice Lumumba become prime minister and Joseph Kasavubu president. In 1965 Mobutu Sese Seko seized power and declared himself president amid the Congo Crisis. He was formally elected to a seven-year term in 1970. Establishing the single-party Republic of Zaire, his presidency was renewed by show elections in 1977 and 1984 while legislative elections were abolished altogether by 1975. Mobutu ruled until 1997 when Laurent Kabila seized power after the First Congo War. When Laurent Kabila was killed in 2001, his son Joseph Kabila took over the presidency while the country was going through the Second Congo War (1998–2003). The Second Congo War was officially declared over in 2003. The period that followed was relatively peaceful, with the United Nations' largest peacekeeping force maintaining the peace. However, the Ituri Conflict marred the peace, with periods of violence in the northeastern Ituri Province. 
In December 2005 a referendum on a new constitution was held. It was approved, paving way for the first multiparty elections in 46 years.

The first multi-party elections in the country since 1960 took place in July 2006. Kabila was elected president and was reelected in 2011. His constitutionally-mandated term ended in 2016, but the government put off a new election, citing logistical problems and the ongoing conflict in the eastern DRC. The long delayed general election finally took place on 30 December 2018, which resulted in a surprise victory for Félix Tshisekedi, although this was questioned by election observers and led to accusations of voter fraud by another opposition candidate, Martin Fayulu. The Constitutional Court of the DRC dismissed Fayulu's challenge of the result, confirming Tshisekedi as the winner. Joseph Kabila stepped down in January 2019, with Tshisekedi being inaugurated as the 5th President of the DRC on January 24. This was the first democratic transition of power in the country since it gained independence in 1960.

Latest elections

January 2018 presidential election

2018 parliamentary election

2018 provincial elections

2019 Senate election

Upcoming elections
The electoral calendar for the 4th election cycle under the new constitution was released on 26 November 2022 by the Independent National Electoral Commission (CENI).  It consists of the following elections:
20 December 2023: General election for president, National Assembly, provincial assemblies, and commune councils.
24 February 2024: Election of senators by provincial assemblies.
12 March: Election of provincial governors by provincial assemblies.
30 March: Election of city councils and burgomasters by commune councils.
27 May: Election of city mayors by city councils.
11 July: Election of chiefdom and sector councils.
17 September: Election of sector chiefs by sector councils.

Of these the elections for the councils (commune, city, sector, and chiefdom) and the elected leaders (burgomaster, mayor, and sector chief) have never been run before under the new constitution.

See also
Electoral calendar
Electoral system
Independent National Electoral Commission

External links
Electionworld
Adam Carr's Election Archive
African Elections Database
Looking at the Congo's Historic Moment An index of resources from the Woodrow Wilson Center on the DRC's democratic 
 A local and an international perspectives on the 2011 elections on 28 November 2011
transition; Last update August 1, 2006

References